The name HMNZS Otago may apply to:

 , a frigate commissioned 1960–1983
 , a patrol boat commissioned in 2007

Royal New Zealand Navy ship names